Taras Aleksandrovich Burlak (born 22 February 1990) is a Russian professional association footballer who plays as centre-back.

Club career

Lokomotiv
Burlak was scouted by Lokomotiv Moscow academy in 2003. In 2007, he joined club youth system, playing for Lokomotiv U21. On 24 September 2008 he made his debut appearance for the main Lokomotiv squad, playing all 90 minutes in Russian Cup home match vs Vityaz Podolsk. The first half of 2009 season he spent on loan at Volga Nizhny Novgorod, gaining first-team experience. In 2010, he made his league debut for Lokomotiv Moscow, coming as a substitute in home match vs Alania Vladikavkaz. In 2011–2012 season Burlak featured regularly for the first team, gaining himself debut call-up for Russia national team. 2012–2013 season saw Burlak continuing his run in Lokomotiv main squad. But after making only one league plus one cup appearance in the first half of 2013–2014 season, Burlak decided to continue his career elsewhere.

Rubin
On 30 January 2014, Lokomotiv Moscow made a transfer agreement with Rubin Kazan and Burlak signed a four-and-a-half-year deal with the Kazan club.

Krylia Sovetov
On 16 January 2018, he signed a long-term deal with Krylia Sovetov Samara.

Arsenal Tula
On 15 August 2020, he moved to FC Arsenal Tula.

International career
Burlak made his debut for the Russia national football team on 7 June 2011 in a friendly against Cameroon.

Career statistics

References

External links
 
 
 

1990 births
Sportspeople from Vladivostok
Russian people of Ukrainian descent
Living people
Russian footballers
Russia youth international footballers
Russia under-21 international footballers
Russia international footballers
Association football defenders
FC Lokomotiv Moscow players
FC Volga Nizhny Novgorod players
FC Rubin Kazan players
PFC Krylia Sovetov Samara players
FC Arsenal Tula players
Russian Premier League players
Russian First League players
Russian Second League players